Kauko Johannes Juhantalo (28 April 1942 – 26 April 2020) was a Finnish politician. A member of the Centre Party, he was member of the Parliament from the electoral district of Satakunta and Minister of Trade and Industry.

Early life and education 

Juhantalo was born and raised in Kankaanpää, Satakunta. He graduated from the University of Turku as Master of Laws in 1972.

Career 
After graduating from law school,  Juhantalo worked as a lawyer. He was first elected to the Parliament in 1979. In 1991, Juhantalo was appointed Minister of Trade and Industry in the Aho Cabinet.

Juhantalo resigned from the government in 1992 when it was revealed that he had insisted Säästöpankkien Keskus-Osake-Pankki give him a bank loan so that the government acquire a portion of Tampella owned by the bank. In 1993, Juhantalo was impeached and convicted of insisting on a bribe and sentenced to conditional discharge for a year. He was also expelled from the Parliament.

Juhantalo returned to the Parliament at the 1995 election. He failed to win a new term in 1999 but was re-elected in 2003. After a second election defeat in 2007, Juhantalo was once again re-elected in 2015 election. He was a member of the Finance Committee of the Parliament. In addition, he was serving as the chairman of the city council of Kankaanpää.

Death 
Juhantalo died of cancer on 26 April 2020, two days before his 78th birthday.

References

External links 

 Juhantalo's website
 Newsreels on Juhantalo's bribery scandal

1942 births
2020 deaths
Deaths from cancer in Finland
People from Kankaanpää
Centre Party (Finland) politicians
Ministers of Trade and Industry of Finland
Members of the Parliament of Finland (1979–83)
Members of the Parliament of Finland (1983–87)
Members of the Parliament of Finland (1987–91)
Members of the Parliament of Finland (1991–95)
Members of the Parliament of Finland (1995–99)
Members of the Parliament of Finland (2003–07)
Members of the Parliament of Finland (2015–19)